This is a list of the National Register of Historic Places listings in Cochise County, Arizona. It is intended to be a complete list of the properties and districts on the National Register of Historic Places in Cochise County, Arizona, United States. The locations of National Register properties and districts for which the latitude and longitude coordinates are included below, may be seen in a map.	
	
There are 86 properties and districts listed on the National Register in the county, including 8 that are also National Historic Landmarks.

Listings county-wide
	

	
|}

See also
	
List of National Historic Landmarks in Arizona	
National Register of Historic Places listings in Arizona

References
	
	
	
	

Cochise